Cowley Beach is a beach, coastal town and locality in the Cassowary Coast Region, Queensland, Australia.

Geography 
	The locality of Cowley Beach is bounded to the north by the Moresby River, to the east by the Coral Sea, and to the south by Liverpool Creek.

Cowley Beach has the following mountains:
 Esmeralda Hill 
 Georgie Hill 
Cowley Beach has the following coastal headlands (from north to south):
 Camp Point
 Hall Point
 Hayter Point
 Double Point

Cowley Beach has the following beaches (from north to south):

 Robinsons Beach, south of Hayter Point
Browns Beach, north of Double Point
Cowley Beach, south of Double Point

The Australian Defence Force's Cowley Beach Military Training Area occupies most of the locality includes the northern part of the beach and most of its hinterland as well as the nearby Lindquist Island. This facility is used for amphibious warfare training, and also includes a rocket range and a cantonment area.

History 
The town takes its name from the beach which in turn takes its name from  Ebenezer Cowley, a horticulturist and overseer at Kamerunga State Nursery. Prior to 16 November 1991 the town was called Inarlinga.

In December 1930, a public reserve along the beachfront of Cowley Beach was established. In January 1931 the beach was attracting increasing numbers of holiday makers.

The Cowley Beach Military Training Area was established in 1962 as the Joint Tropical Research Unit, so-called because it operated in collaboration with the British Ministry of Defence.

Education 
There are no schools in Cowley Beach. The nearest government primary school is Silkwood State School in Silkwood to the south-west. The nearest government secondary school is Innisfail State College in Innisfail to the north.

Amenities 
There is a boat ramp in Bambarook Road. It is managed by the Cassowary Coast Regional Council.

Attractions 
Cowley Beach is a -long beach that extends from Double Point past the town down to the mouth of Liverpool Creek.

References 

Towns in Queensland
Cassowary Coast Region
Beaches of Queensland
Localities in Queensland